Puerto Rico Highway 515 (PR-515) is a short tertiary highway in Ponce, Puerto Rico. The road runs east to west in barrio Guaraguao. It originates at the boundary between barrio Guaraguao and barrio San Patricio on PR-10 and runs west until its terminus with PR-123. The road is approximately 0.75 mile long.

Major intersections

See also

 List of highways in Ponce, Puerto Rico
 List of highways numbered 515

References

External links

 Guía de Carreteras Principales, Expresos y Autopistas 

515
Roads in Ponce, Puerto Rico